Edvart Christensen (21 February 1867 – 13 August 1921) was a Norwegian sailor. He was born in Ramnes. He competed in the 6 metre class at the 1912 Summer Olympics in Stockholm, placing tied fifth with the boat Sonja II, together with Hans Christiansen and his son Eigil Christiansen.

References

1867 births
1921 deaths
People from Re, Norway
Norwegian male sailors (sport)
Sailors at the 1912 Summer Olympics – 6 Metre
Olympic sailors of Norway
Sportspeople from Vestfold og Telemark